The Cyanide & Happiness Show is an American adult animated web series created by Kris Wilson, Rob DenBleyker, Matt Melvin, and Dave McElfatrick based on their webcomic Cyanide & Happiness. Each episode consists of a few short stories that have little to no connection to each other (with the exception of six episodes from Season 3, which were a story arc). The creators described the goal of each episode to be "to extract the human excretion known as laughter from your face hole via fast-paced weird comedy."

The Cyanide & Happiness Show was funded through a successful Kickstarter campaign. The first season was initially released on YouTube from November 12, 2014, to January 21, 2015. The show was later acquired by Seeso, which produced second and third seasons before selling the show to VRV in mid-2017. On February 20, 2019, it was announced that VRV had renewed the show for a fourth season, which comprised 10 episodes.

Production
The Explosm team has been creating short videos based on Cyanide & Happiness for years before working on the full show. The Explosm YouTube channel had over 3.6 million subscribers and 490 million views before The Cyanide & Happiness Show started airing. Some of these short videos, such as "Junk Mail" and "Confession", have proven "overwhelmingly popular" among fans of the webcomic.

The Cyanide & Happiness Show was funded by the means of a Kickstarter campaign in early 2013, where it collected a total of $770,309. This was more than three times the initial goal and broke the record of most money ever funded for an animated series on Kickstarter. Among the "zany gift offerings" given to Kickstarter backers was an "all-expenses-paid trip to Dallas for a Banana Bar Crawl replete with a banana costume, scepter, and crown".

When the Explosm team sat down to plan the first season, they realized 50 percent of the writing for it was already done, with some ideas being over five years old. Many of the stories used in The Cyanide and Happiness Show resulted from the team trying to make each other laugh while in a bar. Due to Wilson living in Fort Collins, Colorado, numerous plane rides and Skype calls had taken place during this process. As the show began to take shape, the team drew out management positions for themselves. McElfatrick was put in charge of art, DenBleyker covered animation and Wilson managed sound design and voice acting, but as the project went on, these roles loosened up. They outsourced some animation production to studios in the U.S., India (Digitoonz), South Korea (BigStar Enterprise, Inc.), and more.

Release
The creators originally attempted to negotiate a TV series deal with cable networks, but due to "concerns about artistic compromise", their efforts were fruitless. One of the creators wrote:

The first episode of The Cyanide and Happiness Show premiered in an Alamo Drafthouse Cinema in Richardson, Texas, on 12 November 2014. Episodes of the series are released on YouTube, but are also available for DRM-free, low-price download. These downloads were released shortly before the episodes are uploaded to YouTube. According to the creators, once bought, people are free to copy, edit and spread the material to their liking.

The second season of The Cyanide and Happiness Show, which started in December 2015, was made available through the Seeso streaming service rather than YouTube. NBCUniversal Cable senior vice president Parra Hadden noted that, shortly after it was announced that The Cyanide and Happiness Show would be hosted on Seeso, the website saw a very large surge in traffic. Seeso renewed the series for a third season later in 2016. Prior to the closure of Seeso in late 2017, The Cyanide & Happiness Show was also made available on the streaming service VRV. The series premiered on cable television in February 2020 on Syfy's late-night programming block TZGZ.

In some countries outside the United States, similar to its format on Syfy, the series is aired as a 22-minute TV series, conjoining two episodes into one.

Reception

Imad Kahn of The Daily Dot described Cyanide & Happiness videos as an "odd, but hilarious, mix of abrupt black humor that's overtly weird and doesn't pretend to be profound. It really does feel like a group of writers with free reign to animate whatever their twisted minds can think of."

Episodes

Season 1 (2014–15)

Season 2 (2015–16)

Season 3 (2017) 
This season was initially released on Seeso, but episodes 6–10 were later removed. In August 2017, it was announced that the rights to the show had been transferred to VRV, another streaming service. Coinciding with this announcement, the rest of the show was removed from Seeso and all episodes of all three seasons were made available on VRV.

Season 4 (2019)

References

American flash animated web series
American adult animated comedy television series
American adult animated web series
Streamy Award-winning channels, series or shows
Seeso original programming
2010s YouTube series
Flash cartoons
American comedy web series